Utpal V Nayanar (born 27 December 1959) is an Indian cinematographer and director from Kasaragod, Kerala.

Personal life

Filmography

References

External links
 
Official Facebook
profile

Indian cinematographers
1959 births
Living people